The 2019 World Judo Juniors Championships was an edition of the World Judo Juniors Championships, organised by the International Judo Federation. It was held in Marrakesh, Morocco from 16 to 20 October 2019. The final day of competition featured a mixed team event, won by team Japan.

Medal summary

Medal table

Men's events

Women's events

Source Results

Mixed

Source Results

References

External links
 

World Judo Junior Championships
 U21
World Championships, U21
Judo
Judo competitions in Morocco
Judo
Judo, World Championships U21